Nußdorf or Nussdorf may refer to:

 in Poland:
 German name of Orzechówko, Olecko County
 in Germany
 Nußdorf am Inn, Rosenheim district, Bavaria
 Nußdorf (Chiemgau), Traunstein district, Bavaria
 Nußdorf in Landau, Rhineland-Palatinate
 Nußdorf (former village), since 1974 part of Eberdingen, Landkreis Ludwigsburg, Baden-Württemberg
 in Austria
 Nußdorf, Vienna, Austria
 Nußdorf weir and lock
 Nußdorf ob der Traisen, Lower Austria
 Nußdorf am Haunsberg, Salzburg
 Nußdorf am Attersee, Upper Austria
 Nußdorf-Debant, Tyrol
 in the Czech Republic
 German mame of Dolné Orešany
 in Romania
 Năsăud
 Geomal village, Stremț Commune, Alba County

See also 
 Ořech
 Orzechów (disambiguation) (Polish toponyms), Orekhov (disambiguation)
 Orzechowo (disambiguation) (Polish toponyms), Orekhovo (disambiguation)
 Orechová
 Orzechówko (disambiguation) (Polish toponyms)
 Orešany (disambiguation) (Czech and Slovak toponyms)
 Diós (Hungarian toponyms)